Adonai Ulises Martínez Bonilla (born October 3, 1975) is a retired professional football player from El Salvador.

Club career
He started his professional career at Alianza with whom he won two league titles including the 2001 Apertura after scoring one of the goals in the 2-1 Final win against Luis Ángel Firpo. In 2003, he had a short spell at Chalatenango before joining Luis Ángel Firpo. He then moved to Isidro Metapán and San Salvador before another two years at Once Municipal.

On March 31, 2006, he scored his 100th goal in the Primera División de Fútbol de El Salvador after scoring two goals against Águila.

International career
Martínez made his debut for El Salvador in a March 1999 UNCAF Nations Cup match against Guatemala and has earned a total of 21 caps, scoring no goals. He has represented his country in 5 FIFA World Cup qualification matches and played at the 1999 UNCAF Nations Cup as well as at the 2002 CONCACAF Gold Cup.

His final international game was a March 2004 friendly match, also against Guatemala.

Personal life
He became father of his first child at the young age of 19.

Honours
Primera División de Fútbol de El Salvador: 2
 1996/1997, Apertura 2001

References

External links
 

Adonai Martínez sueña a lo grande - El Diario de Hoy 

1975 births
Living people
Sportspeople from San Salvador
Association football midfielders
Salvadoran footballers
El Salvador international footballers
2002 CONCACAF Gold Cup players
Alianza F.C. footballers
C.D. Chalatenango footballers
C.D. Luis Ángel Firpo footballers
A.D. Isidro Metapán footballers
San Salvador F.C. footballers
Once Municipal footballers